Unreal, released on March 29, 2006 on Spinefarm, is the first album by the Finnish alternative rock band End of You. In this album, it finds the style that has been presented with the demo album Walking With No One (2004).

Track listing
 "All Your Silence" - 5:08
 "Upside Down" - 4:21
 "Before" - 4:59
 "Walking with No One" - 3:34
 "Rome" - 4:05
 "Liar" - 4:12
 "Dreamside" - 3:44
 "My Absolution" - 3:23
 "Twisted Mind" - 3:59
 "Time to Say" - 8:05
 bonus: "Online" (Digipak CD)

Singles
 Walking With No One (released on January 4, 2006)
 Upside Down (released on March 8, 2006)

Videos
 Twisted Mind
 Liar
 Walking With No One

Credits 
 Jami Pietilä - vocals
 Jani Karppanen - guitar
 Timo Lehtinen - bass
 Joni Borodavkin - keyboards
 Mika Keijonen - drums

2006 albums